Hester is both a female given name and a surname. As a given name Hester is a variant of Esther. As a surname it is of Germanic origin and uncertain meaning, possible roots being the Middle High German heister beech tree indicating residence near a beech tree, or a shared root with the modern German heißen to call indicating the profession of herald or town crier. In Ireland, particularly County Mayo, the surname Hester is found as an Anglicized form of the Gaelic Ó hOistir descendant of Oistir.

Given name
 Hester Adrian, Baroness Adrian (1899—1966), British mental health worker
 Hester Bateman (bap. 1708–1794), English silversmith 
 Hester A. Benedict (1838-1921), American poet and writer
 Hester Biddle (c. 1629–97), English Quaker writer
 Hester Chapone (1727–1801), British author
 Hester A. Davis (1930–2014), American archaeologist
 Hester Dowden (1868–1949), Irish spiritualist medium
 Hester Dunn (b. 1940), Northern Irish former loyalist activist and writer
 Hester Maria Elphinstone, Viscountess Keith (1764-1857), British literary correspondent and intellectual
 Hester Goodsell (born 1984), British rower
 Hester Grenville, 1st Countess Temple (c. 1690–1752), English noblewoman
 Hester Jane Haskins (fl. 1860–75), American madam, procuress, and underworld figure
 Hester Kaplan, American author
 Hester Maclean (1859–1932), New Zealand nurse, editor and writer
 Maria Hester Park (1760–1813), British composer, pianist, and singer
 Hester Pitt, Countess of Chatham (1720–1803), wife of William Pitt (the Elder), 1st Earl of Chatham, who was Prime Minister of Great Britain from 1766 to 1768
 Lady Hester Pulter (b. 1605), British writer
 Catherine Hester Ralfe (c. 1831–1912), New Zealand dressmaker, teacher, storekeeper, housekeeper and diarist
 Hester Dorsey Richardson (1862-1933), American author
 Hester Santlow (c. 1690–1773), British dancer and actress
 Lady Hester Stanhope (1776–1839), British socialite, adventurer and traveler
 Hester Thrale (1741–1821), British diarist, author, and patron of the arts
 Hester van Eeghen (1958–2021), Dutch designer
 Hester Wagstaff (b. 1892), British jewellery designer, potter and illustrator

Surname
 Bart Hester (b. 1977), American politician
 Benny Hester (b. 1948), American music artist and songwriter
 Betty Hester (1923-1998), American correspondent
 Carolyn Hester (b. 1937), American folk singer and songwriter
 Dave Hester, star of A&E TV's Storage Wars
 Devin Hester (b. 1982), American football player
 Drew Hester (b. 1969), American percussionist and record producer
 Eric Hester (b. 1974), American composer
 Hugh B. Hester (1895-1983), American army officer
 Jack W. Hester (1929-1999), American politician
 Jacob Hester (b. 1985), American football player
 James McNaughton Hester (1924-2014), American educator
 Jessie Hester (b. 1963), American football player
 Joan Hester (b. 1932), American politician
 John Hester (b. 1983), American baseball player
 Joy Hester (1920-1960), Australian artist
 Laurel Hester (1956–2006), American police officer and advocate of rights of domestic partners
 Leigh Ann Hester (b. 1982), American soldier and Silver Star recipient
 Lex Hester (1935–2000), American public administrator
 Marc Hester (b. 1985), Danish professional bicycle racer
 Michael Hester (b. 1972), Australian-born New Zealand association football referee
 Paul Hester (1959–2005), Australian musician
 Paul V. Hester (b. 1947), American Air Force officer
 Phil Hester (comics) (b. 1966), comic book artist and writer
 Phillip Doyce Hester (b. 1955), former chief technology officer of Advanced Micro Devices
 Randolph T. Hester American professor, sociologist, and landscape architect 
 Ray Hester (1949–1977), American football player
 Rita Hester (d. 1998), transgender African American murder victim
 Sandra Hester, American activist and former television host
 Stephen Hester (b. 1960), CEO of RSA Insurance Group
 Treyvon Hester (b. 1992), American football player
 Wallace Hester (1866-1942), British caricaturist for Vanity Fair
 William Hester, also known as Slew Hester (1912-1993), American tennis official

Fictional characters
 Hester Latterly, main character of Anne Perry's Monk detective series
 Hester Prynne, main character of Nathaniel Hawthorne's The Scarlet Letter
 The Character and Death of Mrs. Hester Ann Rogers, a 1794 Methodist tract
 Hester Shaw, a character from Philip Reeve's Mortal Engines Quartet
 Hester Ulrich, a character from the 2015 American horror comedy television series, Scream Queens.
 Hester Crane, mother of Frasier Crane of Cheers and Frasier television shows. 
 Hester, the daemon companion of Lee Scoresby in Philip Pullman's His Dark Materials series.
 Hester Sherwood, one of the four characters from the Australian 2002 play Wicked Sisters by Alma De Groen.
 Hester, the daughter of the witch from Hansel and Gretel in School for Good and Evil

See also 

Hessy, a related name and nickname

English feminine given names